Spurs is a 1930 American Western film written and directed by B. Reeves Eason and starring Hoot Gibson, Helen Wright, Robert Homans, Philo McCullough, C.E. Anderson and Buddy Hunter. It was released on August 24, 1930, by Universal Pictures.

Plot
Looking for the killer of Buddy Hazlet's father, Bob Merrill and his friend secretly invade the hideout of the Pecos gang. After learning the true identity of the murderer and that the gang captured his friends Buddy and Shorty, Bob decides to wait for the gang to return to the hideout and fires on them with their own machine guns. The gang is captured and the murderer confesses his crimes.

Cast 
Hoot Gibson as Bob Merril
Helen Wright as Peggy Bradley
Robert Homans as Dad Merril 
Philo McCullough as Tom Mardson
C.E. Anderson as Pecos 
Buddy Hunter as Buddy Hazlet
Gilbert Holmes as Shorty Clark 
William Bertram as Indian Joe

References

External links 
 

1930 films
American Western (genre) films
1930 Western (genre) films
Universal Pictures films
Films directed by B. Reeves Eason
American black-and-white films
1930s English-language films
1930s American films